The 2016–17 UNC Asheville Bulldogs men's basketball team represented the University of North Carolina at Asheville during the 2016–17 NCAA Division I men's basketball season. The Bulldogs, led by fourth-year head coach Nick McDevitt, played their home games at Kimmel Arena as members of the Big South Conference. They finished the season 23–10, 15–3 in Big South play to finish in a tie for the Big South regular season championship. They were upset in the quarterfinals of the Big South tournament by Campbell. They were invited to the CollegeInsider.com Tournament where they lost in the first round to UT Martin.

Previous season 
The Bulldogs finished the 2015–16 season 22–12, 12–6 in Big South play to finish in a tie for third place. They defeated Liberty, High Point, and Winthrop to become champions of the Big South tournament. They received conference's automatic bid to the NCAA tournament where they were lost in the first round to the eventual National Champion Villanova.

Roster

Schedule and results

|-
!colspan=9 style=| Exhibition

|-
!colspan=9 style=| Non-conference regular season

|-
!colspan=9 style=| Big South Conference regular season

|-
!colspan=9 style=| Big South tournament

|-
!colspan=9 style=| CIT

References

UNC Asheville Bulldogs men's basketball seasons
UNC Asheville
UNC Asheville
Asheville
Asheville